Loch Fleet, a sea loch on the east coast of Sutherland, Scotland.
 Loch Fleet, Galloway, a freshwater loch in Galloway.